"Strutter" is a song by the American rock band Kiss, released in 1974 on their self-titled debut album, Kiss. It was the third single released from the album and failed to chart.

"Strutter" is one of the few Kiss songs written by Gene Simmons and Paul Stanley together. Stanley wrote new lyrics to "Stanley the Parrot", a song whose music was composed by Simmons. Stanley's lyrics display his Bob Dylan influence. The song was featured in the video games Grand Theft Auto: San Andreas and Guitar Hero 2.

Critical reception
"Strutter" is widely considered one of Kiss's best songs. Cash Box said that "this may be their most dynamic [rock 'n' roll song] to date" and has "lots of bass and guitar, along with those power driven vocals here, all making for a great single release."  Record World called it "pleasurably pompous rock in the best style and tradition of hard, boogie-gaited music." In 2014, Paste ranked the song number two on their list of the 20 greatest Kiss songs, and in 2019, Louder Sound ranked the song number five on their list of the 40 greatest Kiss songs.

Covers
Extreme covered the song on the Kiss My Ass: Classic Kiss Regrooved album (1994).
The Donnas covered the song for the Detroit Rock City soundtrack (1999).
Vitamin String Quartet covered the song for the String quartet tribute to kiss album (2004).
Electric Six covered the song in their covers album, Streets of Gold (2021)

Appearances
"Strutter" has appeared on the following Kiss albums:
Kiss – studio version
Alive! – live version
The Originals – studio version
Double Platinum – re-recorded version titled "Strutter '78" ("I look back at that and think, 'Why?'" remarked Simmons in 1996. "The original version is the classic and the best.")
Smashes, Thrashes & Hits – remixed & edited studio version
Greatest Kiss – studio version
The Box Set – demo version
The Very Best of Kiss – studio version
Kiss Symphony: Alive IV – live version
The Best of Kiss: The Millennium Collection – studio version
Gold – studio version
Kiss Chronicles: 3 Classic Albums – studio version
Kiss Alive! 1975–2000 – Alive! version
Kiss Alive 35 – live version
Ikons – studio version
Kiss 40 – re-recorded version titled "Strutter '78"

Personnel
Paul Stanley – lead vocals, rhythm guitar
Gene Simmons – bass, backing vocals
Peter Criss – drums, backing vocals
Ace Frehley – lead guitar

References

Kiss (band) songs
1974 singles
Songs written by Paul Stanley
Songs written by Gene Simmons
Casablanca Records singles
Warner Records singles
1974 songs
Glam rock songs

sv:Kiss (musikalbum)#Strutter